The Irish Sea separates Great Britain and the island of Ireland. The sea has been a significant trade and communications barrier between the two islands for centuries as there is no fixed crossing across it. In 2013, 7.6 megatons of trade was handled between British and Irish ports, and ferry crossings remain the most important link for heavy goods vehicles. Ferry services have continued to be significant, and 3.6 million passengers use these annually.

The main operators across the Irish Sea are P&O Ferries, Irish Ferries, Stena Line and the Isle of Man Steam Packet Company.

Current

Historic

See also 
 Irish Sea fixed crossing

References

Notes

Bibliography

Irish Sea
Lists of ferry routes